Threnosia agraphes is a moth in the subfamily Arctiinae. It was described by Turner in 1940. It is found in Australia, where it has been recorded from Victoria.

References

Moths described in 1940
Lithosiini